Sligo Rovers Football Club Women is an Irish association football club based in Sligo. In December 2021 the Football Association of Ireland (FAI) announced the formation of the club as an expansion team for the upcoming 2022 Women's National League season. It is the women's section of Sligo Rovers. The senior team plays in the Women's National League while junior teams compete at Women's Under 17 National League and Women's Under 19 National League level.

History 
In July 2018 Sligo Rovers were among 11 founding clubs in a new Under-17 Women's National League. Club chairman Tommy Higgins affirmed his commitment to women's football in May 2021, while announcing his ambition to rebuild The Showgrounds using "a huge element of public funding". In September 2021 the club announced plans to collaborate with Institute of Technology, Sligo, in fielding a senior women's team in the Women's National League from 2022. On 10 December 2021 the Football Association of Ireland (FAI) confirmed the acceptance of the club as an expansion team for the upcoming 2022 Women's National League season.

On 15 December 2021 former Rovers player Steve Feeney was appointed as the senior women's team's first manager, leaving his role at Ballinamallard United to take up the post. Emma Hansberry became the club's first signed player on 11 January 2022. Amy Hyndman and Katie Melly followed on 20 January. The club played its first friendly match on 22 January 2022, beating Conn Rangers, a non-League team from neighbouring County Mayo, 6–3 at the "Sean Fallon Centre" all weather pitch at The Showgrounds before a crowd of about 300 people.

On the opening day of the 2022 Women's National League, 5 March 2022, Sligo Rovers lost their first competitive match 6–0 at Peamount United. The FAI later awarded Sligo Rovers a 3–0 walkover win, when Peamount reported themselves for fielding an ineligible player in the match. Seven days later the first home match at The Showgrounds was lost 3–0 to DLR Waves before an encouraging crowd of 945. On 19 March 2022 the club secured its first ever competitive win, 2–1 over Cork City at Turners Cross. Gemma McGuinness scored the club's first official goal in the match.

Players

Current squad

References

External links

Women
Association football clubs established in 2022
Sport in Sligo (town)
Association football clubs in Connacht
2022 establishments in Ireland
Women's association football clubs in the Republic of Ireland
Women's National League (Ireland) teams